Maryland's Legislative District 23 is one of 47 districts in the state for the Maryland General Assembly. It covers part of Prince George's County. Up until the 2020 United States redistricting cycle, the district was divided into two sub-districts for the Maryland House of Delegates: District 23A and District 23B.

Demographic characteristics
As of the 2020 United States census, the district had a population of 135,756, of whom 106,376 (78.4%) were of voting age. The racial makeup of the district was 25,827 (19.0%) White, 88,037 (64.8%) African American, 603 (0.4%) Native American, 5,035 (3.7%) Asian, 19 (0.0%) Pacific Islander, 6,820 (5.0%) from some other race, and 9,374 (6.9%) from two or more races. Hispanic or Latino of any race were 12,159 (9.0%) of the population.

The district had 100,430 registered voters as of October 17, 2020, of whom 13,968 (13.9%) were registered as unaffiliated, 10,093 (10.0%) were registered as Republicans, 74,345 (74.0%) were registered as Democrats, and 1,686 (1.7%) were registered to other parties.

Political representation
The district is represented for the 2023–2027 legislative term in the State Senate by Ronald L. Watson (D) and in the House of Delegates by Adrian Boafo (D), Marvin E. Holmes Jr. (D) and Kym Taylor (D).

References

Prince George's County, Maryland
23